Eduardo Gomes (born 31 December 1965) is a Portuguese sprint canoeist who competed in the late 1980s. At the 1988 Summer Olympics in Seoul, he was eliminated in the repechages of the K-2 1000 m event.

References
Sports-Reference.com profile

External links

1965 births
Canoeists at the 1988 Summer Olympics
Living people
Olympic canoeists of Portugal
Portuguese male canoeists
Place of birth missing (living people)